The historic industrial site of Pulacayo is located in the Potosí Department of Bolivia. The mining center developed around Huanchaca, the world's second largest silver mine, and was founded in 1833.  Features of the mining center include: 
Aniceto Arce’s house
The Maestranza
The refinery’s smelting works
A spinning mill
The first railroad to ever reach Bolivia

Pulacayo also contains a train that Butch Cassidy and the Sundance Kid robbed.

World Heritage Status 
This site was added to the UNESCO World Heritage Tentative List on July 1, 2003 in the Cultural category

Notes

References 
Pulacayo, Industrial Heritage Site - UNESCO World Heritage Centre Retrieved 2009-03-18.

World Heritage Sites in Bolivia
Bolivian culture
Buildings and structures in Potosí Department